Albert R. Fox House, also known as the Fox Mansion, is a historic home located at Sand Lake in Rensselaer County, New York.  It was built about 1847 and is a large Greek Revival style frame dwelling.  It consists of a two-story, five-bay-wide and four-bay-deep main block, flanked by one-story, two-bay-wide wings.  There is also a large two-story rear wing.  It features a full-width, one-story open porch with Ionic order columns supporting a deep entablature.  Also on the property are a contributing fountain (c. 1860) and two small 19th-century sheds.

It was listed on the National Register of Historic Places in 2001.

References

Houses on the National Register of Historic Places in New York (state)
Greek Revival houses in New York (state)
Houses completed in 1847
Houses in Rensselaer County, New York
1847 establishments in New York (state)
National Register of Historic Places in Rensselaer County, New York